Senso may refer to:

 Senso (novel),   Italian novella by Camillo Boito 1882
 Senso (film), 1954 Italian historical melodrama film by Luchino Visconti
 Senso (opera), Marco Tutino
 Senso (game), disc-shaped musical toy
 Senso (album) album by Australian singer-songwriter Stephen Cummings  1984
 Senso (grape), Cinsaut

See also
In ogni senso (In Every Sense)  album by Eros Ramazzotti 1990
Sensō-ji (金龍山浅草寺, Kinryū-zan Sensō-ji)  Tokyo's oldest temple
Sensō Sōshitsu (仙叟 宗室, 1622-1697) Japanese tea master
Ahen senso (阿片戦爭 The Opium War) 1943 black-and-white Japanese film directed by Masahiro Makino
Shojō Sensō (少女戦争 The Virgin War) 2011 Japanese film directed by Ataru Oikawa
Mahō Sensō (魔法戦争 Magical Warfare) Japanese light novel series written by Hisashi Suzuki and illustrated by Lunalia
Otome Sensō (Z女戦争, "Girl's War")  single by the Japanese female idol group Momoiro Clover Z 2012